Roberto García (born 13 August 1972 in Oviedo, Spain) is the bassist for the power metal band WarCry, also known for his work on Avalanch.

History
García's interest in music started around the age of five. The Spanish guitar, as well as the keyboard, were the instruments he first learned to play. Although his education was centered on classic authors, Roberto had been very interested since his adolescence in bands such as Metallica, Accept and Judas Priest.

In 1997, García asked his friend Alberto Rionda, from Avalanch, to give him guitar classes, and in that manner he became part of the band. He played on four Avalanch albums, La Llama Eterna, Llanto De Un Héroe, Días De Gloria and El Ángel Caído.

After personal and professional problems with Alberto Rionda, Garcia left Avalanch. In 2004, he joined the band WarCry, which had been formed by friends Víctor García and Alberto Ardines.

Discography

Avalanch
 1997 — La Llama Eterna
 1999 — Llanto De Un Héroe
 2000 — Días De Gloria (live)
 2001 — El Ángel Caído

WarCry
 2005 — ¿Dónde Está La Luz?
 2006 — Directo A La Luz (live)
 2006 — La Quinta Esencia
 2008 — Revolución
 2011 — Alfa
 2012 — Omega (live)
 2013 — Inmortal

On tributes
 1999 — Transilvania 666 (Iron Maiden)
 2000 — The Attack of the Dragons (Queen)
 2000 — Metal Gods (Judas Priest)

Collaborations
Indiceission (Human) (2003)

References

WarCry (band) members
Musicians from Asturias
People from Oviedo
Spanish heavy metal musicians
Living people
1972 births
Avalanch members